Charles Bennett Hanneman (September 26, 1914 – March 31, 1999) was an American football player. He played college football and basketball at Michigan State Normal College, winning three letters in each sport.  He then played professional football in the National Football League (NFL) for the Detroit Lions from 1937 and 1941 and for the Cleveland Rams in 1941. He was the Lions' leading receiver in 1939 with 257 receiving yards.

References

1914 births
1999 deaths
American football ends
Detroit Lions players
Cleveland Rams players
Players of American football from Flint, Michigan
Eastern Michigan Eagles football players